O Gwang-sun (born 17 July 1964) is a North Korean archer who represented North Korea at the 1980 Summer Olympic Games.

Career 

O Gwang-sun competed at the 1980 Summer Olympic Games in the women's individual event and finished fifth with a score of 2401 points. At the 1991 World Archery Championships she came 25th.

References

External links 

 Profile on worldarchery.org
 

1964 births
Living people
North Korean female archers
Olympic archers of North Korea
Archers at the 1980 Summer Olympics
Place of birth missing (living people)
Asian Games medalists in archery
Archers at the 1982 Asian Games
Asian Games gold medalists for North Korea
Asian Games silver medalists for North Korea
Medalists at the 1982 Asian Games
20th-century North Korean women